The Popular Patristics Series is a series of volumes of original English translations of mainly first millennium Christian texts published by St. Vladimir's Seminary Press. The aim of the series is "to provide readable and accurate translations of a broad range of early Christian literature to a wide audience—from students of Christian history and theology to lay Christians reading for spiritual benefit." It currently comprises 61 volumes (though six are new editions of previously released volumes). The texts are principally translated from Greek, but some  Latin, Syriac and Coptic writers are included. Each volume is translated by a recognized patristic scholar and also contains a concise but comprehensive introduction to the patristic author and their works. John Behr was the longtime series editor until 2020, when he handed off the role to Bogdan Bucur and assistant editor Ignatius Green.

Series
 On the Priesthood by St. John Chrysostom
 Lectures on the Christian Sacraments by St. Cyril of Jerusalem (Discontinued)
 On the Divine Images by St. John of Damascus (Discontinued)
 On the Incarnation by St. Athanasius (Discontinued)
 On the Holy Spirit by St. Basil the Great (Discontinued)
 On the Holy Icons by St. Theodore the Studite
 On Marriage and Family Life by St. John Chrysostom
 On the Divine Liturgy by St. Germanus of Constantinople
 On Wealth and Poverty by St. John Chrysostom (2nd edition published 2020)
 Hymns on Paradise by St. Ephrem the Syrian
 On Ascetical Life by St. Isaac of Nineveh
 On the Soul and Resurrection by St. Gregory of Nyssa
 On the Unity of Christ by St. Cyril of Alexandria
 On the Mystical Life: The Ethical Discourses, vol. 1: The Church and The Last Things by St. Symeon the New Theologian
 On the Mystical Life: The Ethical Discourses, vol. 2: On Virtue and Christian Life by St. Symeon the New Theologian
 On the Mystical Life: The Ethical Discourses, vol. 3: Life, Times, and Theology  by St. Symeon the New Theologian
 On the Apostolic Preaching by St. Irenaeus of Lyons
 On the Dormition of Mary: Early Patristic Homilies
 On the Mother of God by Jacob of Serug
 On Pascha by Melito of Sardis  (Discontinued)
 On God and Man: The Theological Poetry of St. Gregory of Nazianzus
 On the Apostolic Tradition by St. Hippolytus (Discontinued)
 On God and Christ, The Five Theological Orations and Two Letters to Cledonius by St. Gregory of Nazianzus
 Three Treatises on the Divine Images by St. John of Damascus (New translation, replaces volume 3)
 On the Cosmic Mystery of Jesus Christ by St. Maximus the Confessor
 Letters from the Desert by St. Barsanuphius and John
 Four Desert Fathers – Pambo, Evagrius, Macarius of Egypt, and Macarius of Alexandria
 Saint Macarius the Spiritbearer: Coptic Texts Relating to Saint Macarius the Great
 On the Lord’s Prayer by Tertullian, St. Cyprian, & Origen
 On the Human Condition by St. Basil the Great
 The Cult of the Saints by St. John Chrysostom
 On the Church: Select Treatises by St. Cyprian of Carthage
 On the Church: Select Letters  by St. Cyprian of Carthage
 The Book of Pastoral Rule by St. Gregory the Great
 Wider Than Heaven: Eighth-century Homilies on the Mother of God
 Festal Orations by St. Gregory of Nazianzus
 Counsels on the Spiritual Life, Volumes One and Two by St. Mark the Monk
 On Social Justice by St. Basil the Great
  Harp of Glory (Enzira Sebhat): An Alphabetical Hymn of Praise for the Ever-Blessed Virgin Mary from the Ethiopian Orthodox Church
 Divine Eros: Hymns of Saint Symeon the New Theologian
 On the Two Ways: Life or Death, Light or Darkness: Foundational Texts in the Tradition
 On the Holy Spirit by St. Basil the Great (New translation, replaces volume 5)
 Works on the Spirit by St. Athanasius the Great and Didymus the Blind
 On the Incarnation by St. Athanasius (New translation, replaces volume 4. Available in Greek and English (44A) or English only (44B))
 Treasure-house of Mysteries: Exploration of the Sacred Text Through Poetry in the Syriac Tradition
 Poems on Scripture by St. Gregory of Nazianzus
 On Christian Doctrine and Practice St. Basil the Great
 Light on the Mountain: Greek Patristic and Byzantine Homilies on the Transfiguration of the Lord
 The Letters by St. Ignatius of Antioch
 On Fasting and Feasts by St. Basil the Great
 On Christian Ethics by St. Basil the Great
 Give Me a Word: The Alphabetical Sayings of the Desert Fathers
 Two Hundred Chapters On Theology by St. Maximus the Confessor
 On the Apostolic Tradition (Second Edition) by St. Hippolytus (Replaces volume 22)
 On Pascha (Second Edition) by Melito of Sardis (Replaces volume 20)
 Letters to Saint Olympia by St. John Chrysostom
 Lectures on the Christian Sacraments (Second Edition) by St. Cyril of Jerusalem (Replaces volume 2)
 The Testament of the Lord: Worship and Discipline in the Early Church
 On the Ecclesiastical Mystagogy: A Theological Vision of the Liturgy by St. Maximus the Confessor 
 Catechetical Discourse: A Handbook for Catechists by St. Gregory of Nyssa
 Hymns of Repentance by St. Romanos the Melodist
 On the Orthodox Faith: Volume 3 of the Fount of Knowledge by St. John of Damascus
 Headings on Spiritual Knowledge: The Second Part, Chapters 1-3 by St. Isaac of Nineveh
 On Death and Eternal Life by St. Gregory of Nyssa

References

External links 

Popular Patristics Series
Popular Patristics Full Series Set
St. Vladimir's Seminary Press

Series of non-fiction books